Kathryn W. Jablokow is an American engineer focused on engineering education, the engineering design process, and the cognitive psychology of engineering creativity. She is a professor of engineering design and mechanical engineering at the Penn State Great Valley School of Graduate Professional Studies, and a program director for engineering research initiation in the Division of Civil, Mechanical & Manufacturing Innovation of the National Science Foundation.

Education and career
Jablokow is the youngest of three children of Herman R. Weed (1922–2022), a biomedical engineer and professor of electrical engineering at the Ohio State University; her mother was a teacher of German. She was educated in electrical engineering at Ohio State, earning a bachelor's degree in 1983, master's degree in 1985, and Ph.D. in 1989. Her graduate research, involving the design of large machines that walk, was supervised by David E. Orin, and she also counts Robert E. Fenton as a faculty mentor.

She was a NSF-NATO Postdoctoral Fellow at RWTH Aachen University before returning to the US to join the Penn State faculty in 1990. At Penn State Great Valley, she was associate chief academic officer from 2017 to 2020; she began a two-year term at the National Science Foundation in 2021.

Recognition
In 2009, Jablokow was named an ASME Fellow. She was the 2016 winner of the Ruth and Joel Spira Outstanding Design Educator Award of the American Society of Mechanical Engineers.

References

External links

Year of birth missing (living people)
Living people
20th-century American engineers
21st-century American engineers
American women engineers
Engineering educators
Ohio State University alumni
Pennsylvania State University faculty
United States National Science Foundation officials
Fellows of the American Society of Mechanical Engineers